Marcus Santos-Silva (born June 7, 1997) is an American football tight end who is a free agent. He previously played college basketball for Texas Tech and VCU.

Early life and high school career
Growing up, Santos-Silva played tight end on the gridiron and preferred football to basketball. During his freshman season at Taunton High School, he decided to focus on basketball after he had a growth spurt and defenders began targeting his knees. Following his sophomore season, Santos-Silva transferred to Bridgewater-Raynham Regional High School. He transferred again to Vermont Academy and repeated his junior year. As a senior, Santos-Silva was named to the Lakes Region all-conference team, helping the team finish 19–11. He committed to VCU over offers from Kansas State, Boston College and Temple, among others.

College career
As a freshman at VCU, Santos-Silva averaged 3.1 points and 3 rebounds per game. During the offseason, he greatly worked on expanding his game, particularly his shooting and conditioning and lost 30 pounds over the summer. In the Atlantic 10 Tournament, Santos-Silva contributed 26 points and 22 rebounds in a quarterfinal victory over Rhode Island, VCU's first 20 and 20 game since Kendrick Warren in 1991. He was named to the Atlantic 10 All-Tournament Team and helped the Rams reach the NCAA Tournament. Santos-Silva averaged 10 points and 7.4 rebounds per game as a sophomore. During the summer, Santos-Silva focused on his rebounding and adding a mid-range shot. On January 5, 2020, he tied his career high with 26 points and grabbed 12 rebounds in a 72–59 win against George Mason. As a junior, Santos-Silva averaged 12.8 points, 8.9 rebounds and 1.3 blocks per game, while shooting 56.9 percent from the floor. Following the season, he decided to transfer to Texas Tech as a graduate transfer. He finished his bachelor's degree in Homeland Security and Emergency Preparedness in the summer of 2020, and was eligible for Texas Tech immediately.

Santos-Silva was named the preseason Big 12 Conference newcomer of the year. In his Texas Tech debut on November 25, Santos-Silva finished with 10 points and 12 rebounds in a 101–58 win against Northwestern State. He averaged 8.3 points and 6.4 rebounds per game. Following the season he announced that he was returning to Texas Tech for his fifth season of eligibility.

Statistics

College

|-
| style="text-align:left;"| 2017–18
| style="text-align:left;"| VCU
| 33 || 0 || 9.8 || .535 || – || .400 || 3.0 || .3 || .1 || .5 || 3.1
|-
| style="text-align:left;"| 2018–19
| style="text-align:left;"| VCU
| 33 || 33 || 22.2 || .594 || – || .597 || 7.4 || .7 || .8 || 1.1 || 10.0
|-
| style="text-align:left;"| 2019–20
| style="text-align:left;"| VCU
| 31 || 31 || 27.2 || .569 || – || .551 || 8.9 || .9 || 1.1 || 1.3 || 12.8
|-
| style="text-align:left;"| 2020–21
| style="text-align:left;"| Texas Tech
| 29 || 29 || 23.6 || .531 || .000 || .578 || 6.4 || 1.3 || .7 || 1.1 || 8.3
|- class="sortbottom"
| style="text-align:center;" colspan="2"| Career
| 126 || 93 || 20.5 || .563 || .000 || .561 || 6.4 || .8 || .7 || 1.0 || 8.5

Professional football career
Santos-Silva signed with the Cleveland Browns as an undrafted free agent on May 2, 2022 to play tight end. He was waived on August 22, 2022. The San Antonio Brahmas selected him in the 15th round of the 2023 XFL Supplemental Draft on January 1, 2023.

Personal life
Santos-Silva is the son of Louie Silva and Jackie Santos-Silva.  He is a fan of the Boston Celtics.

See also
 List of NCAA Division I men's basketball career games played leaders

References

External links
 Cleveland Browns bio
Texas Tech Red Raiders bio
VCU Rams bio

1997 births
Living people
American men's basketball players
American football tight ends
Basketball players from Boston
Power forwards (basketball)
Texas Tech Red Raiders basketball players
VCU Rams men's basketball players
Vermont Academy alumni
Cleveland Browns players
San Antonio Brahmas players